Rabbi Reuben Joshua Poupko is the Rabbi of Beth Israel Beth Aaron Congregation, an Orthodox synagogue in Montreal, Quebec, Canada. He is the son of Gilda Twerski Novoseller Poupko, scion of the Poupko Hasidic dynasty, and Rabbi Baruch Poupko, rabbi for over 60 years of Congregation Shaare Torah in Pittsburgh. Poupko is married to Mindy Shear of Montreal, where they reside with Mindy’s son Shalev. Rabbi Poupko has 5 children: Adina, Hindy, Tamar, Eliezer and Avi. Poupko is the twin brother of Rivy Poupko Kletenik.

He appeared in three films. Schmelvis: The Search for the King's Jewish Roots is a documentary investigating Elvis Presley's supposed Jewish roots. He also appeared in the award-winning movie "Once a Nazi" on former Waffen SS soldier turned professor Adalbert Lallier for SCN, CTV, Canal D, CLT and distributed internationally by the National Film Board of Canada. The film Untying the Bonds ... Jewish Divorce is a documentary that was produced by the Coalition of Jewish Women for the Get that tries to "increase awareness of the Jewish divorce issue" features comments by Poupko on the issue.

Poupko has been the spiritual leader on the March of the Living. He is also the "co-chair of the Canadian Rabbinic Caucus".

References

Canadian Orthodox rabbis
Canadian people of Russian-Jewish descent
Canadian Zionists
Living people
Canadian twins
Year of birth missing (living people)